Jean-Jacques Boisson (born 25 July 1956) is a French former equestrian. He competed in two events at the 1992 Summer Olympics.

References

External links
 

1956 births
Living people
French male equestrians
Olympic equestrians of France
Equestrians at the 1992 Summer Olympics
People from Niort
Sportspeople from Deux-Sèvres